Players and pairs who neither have high enough rankings nor receive wild cards may participate in a qualifying tournament held one week before the annual Wimbledon Tennis Championships.

Qualifiers

  Svetlana Cherneva
  Carina Karlsson
  Larisa Savchenko
  Kim Steinmetz
  Candy Reynolds
  Kris Kinney
  Elena Eliseenko
  Hélène Pelletier

Qualifying draw

First qualifier

Second qualifier

Third qualifier

Fourth qualifier

Fifth qualifier

Sixth qualifier

Seventh qualifier

Eighth qualifier

External links

1984 Wimbledon Championships on WTAtennis.com
1984 Wimbledon Championships – Women's draws and results at the International Tennis Federation

Women's Singles Qualifying
Wimbledon Championship by year – Women's singles qualifying
Wimbledon Championships